The President is a board game published by Merad Design Games in 1983.

Contents
The President is a game in which the object is to become the next president of the United States, by winning the party nomination and then winning the election itself.

Reception

References

Board games introduced in 1983